McVicker is a surname of Scottish origin. Notable people with the surname include:

Dana McVicker, American country singer
J. McVicker Hunt (1906–1991), American educational psychologist and author
John McVicker, Irish footballer
Mitch McVicker, American Christian music singer-songwriter
Norman McVicker (1940–2008), English cricketer
Roy H. McVicker (1924–1973), American politician

Fictional
Principal McVicker, an antagonist of Beavis and Butthead

See also
 John McVickers (born 1868), Irish soccer footballer
 McVicker's Theater (1857-1984), playhouse in Chicago, IL, U.S.A.
 Vickers (surname)
 McVicar (surname)